The 1978 Waltham Forest Council election took place on 4 May 1978 to elect members of Waltham Forest London Borough Council in London, England. The whole council was up for election and the Labour Party stayed in overall control of the council.

Background

Election result

Ward results

References

1978
1978 London Borough council elections